Algazel may refer to:
Al-Ghazali, a Persian 11th century philosopher
Scimitar Oryx, a north African antelope